The First Battle of Kreminna was a military engagement between Russia and Ukraine over the Eastern Ukrainian city of Kreminna. It is regarded as the first battle during the Battle of Donbas.

Background 
Kreminna, a city of 18,000 people, has been a strategic city since the beginning of the Russian invasion of Ukraine because it is a passage to Kramatorsk, which is only a 1 hour drive from Kreminna.

Battle 
On 18 April 2022, Russian forces entered Kreminna, where the Governor of Luhansk Oblast Serhiy Haidai reported that street fights began and that evacuation was not possible. Tanks and other weaponry also entered where civilians were surrounded by Russian troops. Russian forces attacked from all sides, encircling the city. Fighting continued throughout the night with heavy artillery fire being shot around the streets. Russian forces later captured the city hall on the 19 April. That evening, Serhiy reported that the remaining Ukrainian troops withdrew, giving Russian troops full control of the city.

Aftermath 

Kreminna was the first city to fall during the Donbas Offensive that was announced by Russia on 18 April. The governor reported that 200 civilians were killed, but there could have been more. Ukrainian officials reported on 25 April that Russian forces were killed in an explosion in the Kreminna City Hall by a gas explosion.

See also 
 Outline of the Russo-Ukrainian War

References 

Kreminna
Battles of the war in Donbas
April 2022 events in Ukraine
Eastern Ukraine offensive
Battles involving the Luhansk People's Republic
History of Luhansk Oblast